Al Benecick (March 20, 1937 – September 29, 2015) was a Canadian Football League offensive lineman who played for the Saskatchewan Roughriders from 1959 through 1968. He was part of the Grey Cup championship-winning Saskatchewan Roughriders in 1966.  Benecick retired as a member of the Edmonton Eskimos in 1969.

During Benecick's time as a member of the Saskatchewan Roughriders, he was named to the CFL's Western All-Star team four times.

Benecick was inducted into the Canadian Football Hall of Fame in 1996. He died on September 29, 2015.

References

1937 births
2015 deaths
American players of Canadian football
Canadian Football Hall of Fame inductees
Canadian football offensive linemen
Edmonton Elks coaches
Edmonton Elks players
People from Bristol, Connecticut
Players of American football from Connecticut
Saskatchewan Roughriders players
Syracuse Orange football players